Michael Timothy (nicknamed "Jolly") Carter (born July 20, 1955) is an American-Israeli former basketball player. He played the forward and center positions. He played for 11 seasons in the Israeli Basketball Premier League.

Biography
A native of Eagle Rock, California, the son of Sue Carter ( Rose Niedospal; 1922-2014), Michael Timothy Carter stands 6'8" tall.

He attended Eagle Rock High School, and played basketball for the school. He then attended Drury University (Physical Education; class of 1979). Carter played for the Drury Panthers, who in 1978–79 were 33–2 and won the National Association of Intercollegiate Athletics national championship as he won the 1979 NAIA men's basketball tournament's Charles Stevenson Hustle Award, and who over his two seasons with the team were 62–6. He holds the school's two-year record in rebounds (480). He was inducted into the Drury Panthers Hall of Fame in 2008.

Carter played for 11 seasons in the Israeli Basketball Premier League, living in the country for 13 years. He played for Hapoel Holon, Hapoel Kiryat Gat, Maccabi Netanya, Hapoel Jerusalem, and Ramat Gan. Among his high game records were 31 points in the 1982–83 season and 13 rebounds in the 1992–93 season. In 1996, Hapoel Holon retired his jersey.

Family
Carter and his Israeli-born wife, Hadar, have two Israeli-born (American-Israeli) sons, Ben and Timothy. Ben plays forward for Hapoel Eilat in the Israeli Basketball Premier League.

In later years Carter worked security and coached basketball at his son Ben's alma mater, Bishop Gorman High School (Las Vegas, Nevada) for 21 years. At the 2013 Maccabiah Games, Carter was an assistant coach for Team USA.

References

External links
Twitter page

Living people
Basketball players from Los Angeles
Israeli American
Israeli men's basketball players
Hapoel Holon players
Hapoel Jerusalem B.C. players
1955 births
American men's basketball players
Israeli Basketball Premier League players
Drury Panthers men's basketball players
Ironi Ramat Gan players